Below is the list of foreign delegations attending the 22nd Congress of the Japanese Communist Party, held between 20-24 November 2000.

the People's Republic of China: Communist Party of China
Li Yang, Chief Secretary of the International Department
Lin Li, Director of Japanese Section of Second Asian Bureau
Linu Yingchun, First Secterary of the Japanese Section of the Second Asian Bureau
Cuba: Communist Party of Cuba
Hilda Vasallo, Coordinator of Asia in the Department of International Relations
Czech Republic: Communist Party of Bohemia and Moravia
Miloslav Ransdorf, Vice-Chairman
France: French Communist Party
Daniel Cirera, Member of Executive College, Head of the International Relations
Germany: German Communist Party
Hans Stehr, Chairman
Party of Democratic Socialism
Helmut Ettinger, Deputy Head of International Department
Greece: Communist Party of Greece
Naoum Kopsidis, Member of Central Committee, responsible of the Press Bureau
India: Communist Party of India
A.B. Bardhan, General Secretary
Communist Party of India (Marxist)
Harkishan Singh Surjeet, General Secretary
Italy: Communist Refoundation Party
Franco Giordano, Member of the Secretariat, Chairman of the party group in the Chamber of Deputies
Laos: Lao People's Revolutionary Party
Thongsay Bodhisane, Ambassador to Japan
Mexico: Party of the Democratic Revolution
Genoveva Dominguez Rodriguez, Member of the House of Representatives
Portugal: Portuguese Communist Party
Ruben de Carvalho, Member of the Central Committee, responsible for the Avante! Festival
Russian Federation: Communist Party of the Russian Federation
Leonid Ivanchenko, Member of Presidium, Member of Parliament
South Africa: South African Communist Party
Ben Martins, Member of the Central Committee, Member of the National Parliament
Spain: Communist Party of Spain
Javier Navascues, Member of the Secretariat and the Executive Committee, Member of the Federal Directive of the United Left
Sri Lanka: Communist Party of Sri Lanka
Indika Gunawardena, National Organiser, Member of the Political Bureau, Minister of Higher Education and Information Technology Development
United Kingdom: Communist Party of Britain
Kenny Coyle, International Secretariat, Member of Political Committee
United States: Chris Townsend, individual, trade union activist
Vietnam: Communist Party of Vietnam
Truong Tan Sang, Political Bureau Member, Chief of the Economic Commission
Nguyen Huy Quang, Assistantr Chief of the External Relations Commission
Dong Ngoc Canh, Director of the China-Northeast Asia Division of the External Relations Commission

Associations of foreign residents in Japan:
Korean Residents Union in Japan
General Association of Korean Residents in Japan

Moreover, the embassies of Cambodia, Canada, the People's Republic of China, France, Indonesia, Libya, Russian Federation, Tunisia, Uzbekistan, Vietnam and Yugoslavia attended.

Messages to the congress were sent from
Brazil: Socialist People's Party
the People's Republic of China: Communist Party of China
Cuba: Communist Party of Cuba
Denmark: Socialist People's Party 
Germany: German Communist Party
India: Communist Party of India
India: Communist Party of India (Marxist)
Israel: Communist Party of Israel
Laos: Lao People's Revolutionary Party
Mexico: Party of the Democratic Revolution
Russian Federation: Communist Party of the Russian Federation
Sri Lanka: Communist Party of Sri Lanka
Sweden: Left Party
Vietnam: Communist Party of Vietnam
General Association of Korean Residents in Japan

References
Japanese Communist Party, At the turn of the Century, Japanese Communist Party 22nd Congress. Japan Press Service, Tokyo.

Foreign delegations at the 22nd Japanese Community Party Congress
Communists
Japanese Communist Party